The 1926 Wisconsin Badgers football team was an American football team that represented the University of Wisconsin in the 1926 Big Ten Conference football season. The team compiled a 5–2–1 record (3–2–1 against conference opponents), finished in fifth place in the Big Ten Conference, and outscored all opponents by a combined total of 122 to 72. George Little was in his second and final year as Wisconsin's head coach.

End Jefferson Burrus was selected as the team's most valuable player. Burrus was also selected by the United Press as a second-team player on the 1926 All-Big Ten Conference football team. Doyle Harmon was the team captain.

The team played its home games at Camp Randall Stadium. The stadium's capacity was expanded in 1926 from 29,783 to 38,293. During the 1926 season, the average attendance at home games was 19,228.

Schedule

References

Wisconsin
Wisconsin Badgers football seasons
Wisconsin Badgers football